Raphaëlle Monod (born 18 January 1969) is a French freestyle skier. She was born in Annecy. She competed in the 1992 Winter Olympics in Albertville, and at the 1994 Winter Olympics in Lillehammer, where she placed fourth in women's moguls.

References

External links 
 

1969 births
Living people
Sportspeople from Annecy
French female freestyle skiers
Olympic freestyle skiers of France
Freestyle skiers at the 1992 Winter Olympics
Freestyle skiers at the 1994 Winter Olympics